Daniel Ross may refer to:
 Daniel Ross (actor) (born 1980), American actor, voice actor, and producer
 Daniel Ross (philosopher) (born 1970), Australian philosopher and filmmaker
 Daniel Ross (marine surveyor) (1780–1849), President of the Bombay Geographical Society
 Daniel Ross (defensive lineman) (born 1993), American football defensive tackle
 Daniel S. Ross (Bassist/Vocalist) (born 1966) Studio musician
 Danny Ross (Law & Order: Criminal Intent), fictional character on American TV series Law & Order: Criminal Intent
 Danny Ross (comedian) (1931–1976), British comedian and actor
 Danny Ross (musician) (born 1984), Australian folk, blues and progressive musician
 Dan Ross (American football) (1957–2006), American football tight end 
 Dan Ross (novelist) (1912–1995), Canadian novelist
 Daniel I. Ross Jr. (1923–2008), chairman of the South Carolina Republican Party